The 15th Pan American Games were held in Rio de Janeiro, Brazil from 13 July to 29 July 2007.

Medals

Silver

Men's Sunfish Class: Alexander Zimmermann

Men's – 68 kg: Peter López

Men's – 62 kg: Miñan Mogollon

Men's Greco-Roman (– 74 kg): Sixto Barrera

Bronze

Men's Singles: Rodrigo Pacheco
Women's Singles: Claudia Rivero
Women's Doubles: Jie Meng Jin and Valeria Rivero
Mixed Doubles: Rodrigo Pacheco and Claudia Rivero

Men's – 100 kg: Carlos Zegarra

Women's – 60 kg: Susana Bojaico

Men's Freestyle (– 60 kg): Aldo Parimango
Men's Greco-Roman (– 60 kg): Mario Molina

See also
Peru at the 2008 Summer Olympics

External links
Rio 2007 Official website

Nations at the 2007 Pan American Games
P
2007